Leonid Solarević (Belgrade, 18 September 1854 – Belgrade, 20 April 1929) was a Serbian military officer. As a colonel of the Royal Serbian Army, he was one of the main participants in the May Coup of 1903 against King Alexander I of Serbia.He also served as the 14th Dean of the Academic Board of the Military Academy in Serbia and its chief from 1904 to 1907.

Position at the Serbian court
After a career in artillery, Solarević became aide-de-camp to King Alexander I in August 1893, and the main aide-de-camp in May 1898. Due to his opposition to the King's marriage to Draga Mašin, he was retired at his own request in July 1900. At the same time, he was relieved of his duties as an officer.

Participation in the May Coup
On the day of the May Coup Solarević was reactivated, with the rank of colonel he had before retiring. On the same day, he was appointed commander of the Danube Divisional Area, assuming command in place of murdered Colonel Dimitrije Nikolić, a firm loyalist to the King and the Obrenović dynasty.

Later career
Following the coup, Solarević served as the Minister of Army in 1903, Chief of the Military Academy in 1904–1907, and became a general in 1907. After that, he was retired twice – at his own request in 1910, and at the end of World War I in 1918 (as he was reactivated in 1914).

Personal life
Solarević was married to Danica Kovačević, and had 5 children with her (3 sons and 2 daughters).

References

Bibliography
 
 

1854 births
1929 deaths
Military personnel from Belgrade
People from the Principality of Serbia
People from the Kingdom of Serbia
Royal Serbian Army soldiers
Serbian–Turkish Wars (1876–1878)
People of the Serbo-Bulgarian War
Serbian military personnel of World War I
Government ministers of Serbia
Recipients of the Order of the Cross of Takovo
Defence ministers of Serbia